National Highway 11A (NH 11A) is an Indian National Highway entirely within the state of Rajasthan.

Route
 Dausa
 Lalsot

References

External links
 NH 11A on OpenStreetMap
  NH network map of India

11A
National highways in India (old numbering)